The southern hyliota (Hyliota australis) is a species of Hyliota.
It is found in Angola, Cameroon, Democratic Republic of the Congo, Kenya, Malawi, Mozambique, South Africa, Tanzania, Uganda, Zambia, and Zimbabwe.
Its natural habitats are subtropical or tropical dry forests and dry savanna.

References

External links
 Status of Southern hyliota in South Africa
 Southern hyliota - Species text in The Atlas of Southern African Birds.

southern hyliota
Birds of Sub-Saharan Africa
Birds of Southern Africa
southern hyliota
southern hyliota
Taxonomy articles created by Polbot